The Toronto Hockey Club, also known as the Torontos and the Toronto Blueshirts, were a professional ice hockey team based in Toronto, Ontario, Canada. They were a member of the National Hockey Association (NHA). The club was founded in 1911 and began operations in 1912. The club won its sole Stanley Cup championship in 1914. The Toronto Hockey Club, which was also known as the Blue Shirts, competed in the NHA from the 1912–13 season to midway through the 1916–17 season when the team suspended operations.  In the following offseason, the NHA suspended operations, never to return.  Four NHA clubs formed the National Hockey League and granted a temporary franchise to an unnamed Toronto 'hockey club' as a replacement for the NHA team in Toronto. However, the roster was composed mostly of former Blue Shirts, leading the press to call this team "the Torontos" or "the Blue Shirts."  This temporary franchise would evolve into today's Toronto Maple Leafs.

Table keys

Year by year

Notes
 The NHA's Quebec Bulldogs held the Stanley Cup entering the 1913-14 season.  The Toronto Hockey Club won the Cup by winning the NHA Finals, then successfully defended the Cup against the Pacific Coast Hockey Association champions.
 The Toronto Hockey Club was suspended by the NHA for the remainder of the second half of the season.

References

See also
List of Toronto Maple Leafs seasons

Seasons
National Hockey League team seasons
Toronto Blueshirts seasons
Toronto Blueshirts seasons
Ontario sport-related lists